William Haddad (July 25, 1928 – April 30, 2020) was an American political operative, lobbyist, and journalist who held a series of high-profile jobs during his lifetime. He is most known for being an aide to the Kennedy Family, during which he helped launch the Peace Corps with R. Sargent Shriver, worked in the 1960 presidential campaign of John F. Kennedy and the 1968 presidential campaign of Robert F. Kennedy. He also assisted prominent Democratic Party figures such as Mario Cuomo and Estes Kefauver and led the fight for affordable medicine as a lobbyist and businessman.

Early life and education 
Haddad was born on July 25, 1928, in Charlotte, North Carolina to Esther (Nowack) Haddad, a Jewish immigrant from Russia, and Charles Haddad, an Egyptian Jew. He graduated from St. Petersburg Junior College in Florida and received a bachelor’s degree from Columbia College in 1954. He also studied at the Columbia Graduate School of Journalism.

Career 
After finishing college, Haddad began a career moving back and forth between business, journalism, and politics. He first worked for Senator Estes Kefauver (D-NY) from 1954 to 1956 and helped secure his nomination as Adlai Stevenson’s vice-presidential running mate, beating out John F. Kennedy at the 1956 Democratic National Convention.

He later worked for the New York Post and helped expose the corruption of Robert Moses, which led to his eventual downfall. He won a Polk Award in 1958 and shared another in 1959 for his investigate reporting.

He then took a break from his journalism career and served as special assistant to John F. Kennedy during his presidential campaign. He also served as an aide to Sargent Shriver, with whom he helped found the Peace Corps and served as its as first associate director and inspector general from 1961 to 1963.

After his stint at the Peace Corps, Haddad returned to work for the New York Herald Tribune, whose publisher, John Hay Whitney, was his father-in-law. He resigned from the newspaper after spending a few months on the investigative team and unsuccessfully challenged Democratic Congressman Leonard Farbstein for his seat in New York's 19th congressional district.

After losing the primary, he served as the inspector general for the Office of Economic Opportunity from 1964 to 1966. He advised Robert F. Kennedy during his presidential campaign in 1968, served on the Board of Education of New York, and enlisted prominent activist Roy Innis in a newspaper called The Manhattan Tribune to provide a biracial perspective. The paper ceased publications in 1972.

In 1972, Haddad sent a letter to investigative journalist Jack Anderson warning him of a tip-off from a private investigator about a plan by the Nixon administration to wiretap the telephones at the Democratic National Committee. Anderson was focused on reporting on a separate scandal involving the Attorney General-nominee Richard Kleindienst's handling of an antitrust suit against ITT Inc. at the Justice Department and so did not follow up on the tip. The wiretapping plan eventually led to the Watergate scandal and the political downfall of President Richard Nixon.

In his business career, he joined a venture with John DeLorean in the newly founded DeLorean Motor Company in 1979 and served as its marketing director. He left the company after discovering its financial management and published a book, Hard Driving: My Years With John DeLorean, chronicling the rise and fall of their joint venture.

He then served as Mario Cuomo's campaign manager and helped his election as Governor of New York in 1982. Afterwards, he began to lobby to reduce the prices of prescription drugs and served as the chairman of the Generic Pharmaceutical Industry Association that was merged into the Association for Accessible Medicines. His lobbying was instrumental in the passing of the Drug Price Competition and Patent Term Restoration Act in 1984, which helped launch the generic drug industry in the United States. He also worked with Indian scientist Yusuf Hamied of Cipla to distribute low-cost medicine to combat HIV/AIDS in Africa and India.

Personal life 
In 1959, Haddad married Kate Roosevelt, daughter of Congressman James Roosevelt and Betsey Cushing Roosevelt Whitney, granddaughter of President Franklin D. Roosevelt and pioneering neurosurgeon Harvey Cushing. Her mother divorced James Roosevelt and was remarried to John Hay Whitney, the American Ambassador to the United Kingdom, who adopted Roosevelt as his daughter. The marriage ended in divorce and his second marriage to Noreen Walsh also ended in divorce.

He died on April 30, 2020 due to congestive heart failure.

He is survived by Lulie Haddad, Laura Whitney-Thomas and Andrea Haddad, children from his first marriage, Amanda Reina and Robert Haddad from his second marriage, a stepson, 13 grandchildren, and two great-grandsons.

References 

1928 births
2020 deaths
20th-century American journalists
American male journalists
Lobbying
Columbia College (New York) alumni
Roosevelt family
Whitney family
American businesspeople
Columbia University Graduate School of Journalism alumni
American people of Russian-Jewish descent
American people of Egyptian-Jewish descent
Peace Corps people